The Portrait of Unknown Man is a sculptural bust by the Italian seventeenth-century artist Gianlorenzo Bernini. In 2015, it was acquired by the Los Angeles County Museum of Art.

See also
 List of works by Gian Lorenzo Bernini

References

Sculptures by Gian Lorenzo Bernini
Marble sculptures
1670s sculptures